Mar Geevarghese Dionysious Memorial Hospital (MGDM) is a hospital established in 1964 in Kangazha under the Manohar Hill Charitable Trust.

Departmental specialties
 General Medicine
 General Surgery
 Cardiology
 Obstetrics & Gynaecology
 Ophthalmology
 Gastroenterology
 Paediatrics
 Paediatric Surgery
 Psychiatry
 Otolaryngeology
 Orthopaedic Surgery
 Physical Medicine
 Anaesthesiology
 Urology
 Nephrology
 Oro-dental Surgery
 Neurology
 Radiology

Specialty units

 Casualty, Accidents and Trauma Care Unit (24hrs)
 Post Operative Critical Care Unit
 Acute Medical Care unit attached to Casualty
 Medical ICU
 Neuro ICU/Stroke Unit
 Coronary Care Unit
 Govt. Licensed Blood Bank
 Vellre CMC Quality Controlled Laboratory (24Hrs)
 24 Hrs Pharmacy Service
 Dialysis Unit - separate section for Hepatitis patients (24 hrs)
 Physiotherapy & Rehabilitation Services
 General Operation theatre complex.
 Eye Theatre

Diagnostic and supportive services

 Stryker Knee Navigator
 Modern Clinical Laboratory
 Central 24Hr Pharmacy
 Computer Assisted Joint Transplantation
 C Arm
 X-ray
 Ultrasound Scan
 Echo Cardiography
 T M T
 Color Doppler
 E.C.G. 
 E.E.G
 H.F.A.
 A - Scan
 B - Scan
 Phacoemulsifier
 Dietary & Canteen
 Chaplaincy services

Out -reach services
It also provides specialized out reach programmes like:
 Eye camp under the Ophthalmology Department
 School Health programmes,
 Joint Clinic under Orthopedics Department on Every SATURDAYS
 Pregnancy & Neonatal Care clinic under Gynecology Department
 Asthma Clinic under the General Medicine Department
 Diabetic Clinic under the General Medicine Department
 Under five clinics & High Risk Clinic under the Pediatrics Department
 Speech and Hearing clinic under the E N T Department
 Developmental and Rehabilitation clinic
 Adolescent clinic etc.

Allied institutions
 Theophilus College of Nursing
 P. Geevarghese School of Nursing
 School of Medical Laboratory Technology
 Baselios Higher Secondary School
 P G M College

References

External links
MGDM Hospital, Devagiri, Kangazha, Kottayam
Theophilus College of Nursing, Devagiri, Kangazha, Kottayam
P Geevarghese School of Nursing, Devagiri, Kangazha, Kottayam
P G M College, Devagiri, Kangazha, Kottayam
Baselios Higher Secondary School, Devagiri, Kangazha, Kottayam
School of Laboratory Technology MGDM Hospital, Devagiri, Kangazha, Kottayam

Hospital buildings completed in 1964
Hospitals in Kerala
1964 establishments in Kerala
Buildings and structures in Kottayam district
20th-century architecture in India